Andres Vazquez de Prada y Vallejo (December 19, 1924 in Valladolid – August 27, 2005 in Madrid) was a Spanish historian, lawyer, professor, diplomat and writer.

Life 
He studied law in Valladolid and Seville, where he was later professor of Governmental Law. In 1947, his doctoral thesis, General Theory of De Facto Governments, obtained the prize for outstanding work at the University of Madrid.

Later he focussed his professional efforts in the field of diplomacy and moved to London, where he worked in the Spanish embassy as embassy attaché while also carrying out a notable literary work. He has published several studies on important figures in the English Catholic Church, including The dream of an old man (1954) on John Henry Newman.

He played an active role in the start and growth of Opus Dei's apostolic work in the United Kingdom. He met Josemaria Escriva de Balaguer in the first Center of Opus Dei in Valladolid. On September 28, 1942 he requested admission as a Numerary. From 1977 on he devoted himself full-time to researching the life of St. Josemaria Escriva de Balaguer which resulted in his three-volume biography of the founder of Opus Dei. In the 1990s, during the writing of this biography, he lived in Rome. After completing the work, he returned to Spain. After a long sickness he died in Madrid on August 27, 2005.

Selected list of works
 Cardinal Newman (1954)
 Thomas More (1966)
 El scented del humor (The Meaning of Humor) (1976)
 The Founder of Opus Dei, Volume I: The Early Years, Princeton (N.J.), Scepter Publishers, 2001
 The Founder of Opus Dei, Volume II - God and Daring, New York, 2003
 The Founder of Opus Dei, Volume III: The Divine Ways on Earth, New York, 2005

References

1924 births
2005 deaths
20th-century Spanish writers
20th-century Spanish male writers
University of Seville alumni
University of Valladolid alumni
Opus Dei members
Spanish expatriates in Italy
Spanish expatriates in the United Kingdom